Gianna Gancia (born 31 December 1972, in Bra) is an Italian politician.

In 2009 she was elected President of the Province of Cuneo. In 2014 she was elected to the Regional Council of Piedmont, with 6,284 preference votes.

In the 2019 EP election she has been elected as a member of the European Parliament.

References

1972 births
Living people
MEPs for Italy 2019–2024
Members of the Regional Council of Piedmont
Presidents of the Province of Cuneo
21st-century women MEPs for Italy
Lega Nord MEPs